Khanqah Dogran is a municipal committee in Tehsil Safdarabad (Old Name Chah Mansur), Municipal Corporation Sheikhupura, in Central Punjab Region, Province Punjab, Islamic Republic of Pakistan.

In 2005, Nankana Sahib District was split off from Sheikhupura District. Khanqah Dogran was one of the towns included in the new district. Residents protested for five days in opposition to the change, during which time some of the protesters burnt down a police station. In December 2008, Khanqah Dogran was added back into Sheikhupura District as part of Safdarabad Tehsil.
Every Year in 1at date of Sawan month ( Desi month ) a festival held on called as Hazrat Baba Haji Diwan Sahib Mela.a famous personality of khanqah doran Molana pir abd ul Kareem (muhaddis e abdalvi) was Died on 31 October 2003.Huzoor Muhaddis e Abdalvi's Urs is held every year on 31st October in Sunni Rizvi Jamia Masjid in front of his Mazar Sharif.
(Articale will complete soon)

References

External links 
 Khakan Dogran

Populated places in Sheikhupura District